The Canecão Mineiro nightclub fire occurred on 24 November 2001 in Belo Horizonte, Minas Gerais, Brazil, killing 7 people and injuring 197 others. The fire was caused by pyrotechnics set off on the stage.

See also 

List of nightclub fires

External links 
 
 

Belo Horizonte
Fires in Brazil
2001 disasters in Brazil
2001 fires in South America
Nightclub fires started by pyrotechnics
Fire disasters involving barricaded escape routes
November 2001 events in South America